Musbanda or Mousbanda, also called Mousbada, was a town of ancient Cilicia and later of Isauria, inhabited in Roman and Byzantine times. It became a bishopric; no longer the seat of a residential bishop, it remains a titular see of the Roman Catholic Church.

Its site is located near Dumlugöze, Asiatic Turkey.

References

Populated places in ancient Cilicia
Populated places in ancient Isauria
Catholic titular sees in Asia
Former populated places in Turkey
Roman towns and cities in Turkey
Populated places of the Byzantine Empire
History of Karaman Province